Md. Kamruzzaman is a Bangladesh Awami League politician and the former Member of Parliament of Jhenaidah-1.

Career
Kamruzzaman was elected to parliament from Jhenaidah-1 as a Bangladesh Awami League candidate in 1986.

References

Awami League politicians
Living people
3rd Jatiya Sangsad members
Year of birth missing (living people)
People from Jhenaidah District